The  was a government position in Japan in the late Nara and Heian periods. The position was consolidated in the Taihō Code of 702.

The Asuka Kiyomihara Code of 689 marks the initial appearance of the sadaijin in the context of a central administrative body called the Daijō-kan (Council of State). This early Daijō-kan was composed of the three ministers—the daijō-daijin (Chancellor), the sadaijin and the udaijin (Minister of the Right).

The sadaijin was the Senior Minister of State, overseeing all functions of government with the udaijin as his deputy.

Within the Daijō-kan, the sadaijin was second only to the daijō-daijin (the Great Minister, or Chancellor of the Realm) in power and influence. Frequently, a member of the Fujiwara family would take the position in order to help justify and exercise the power and influence the family held.

The post of sadaijin, along with the rest of the Daijō-kan structure, gradually lost power over the 10th and 11th centuries, as the Fujiwara came to dominate politics more and more. The system was essentially powerless by the end of the 12th century, when the Minamoto, a warrior clan, seized control of the country from the court aristocracy (kuge). However, it is not entirely clear when the Daijō-kan system was formally dismantled prior to the Meiji era.

See also 
 Imperial Household Agency
 Kōkyū
 Kugyō
 List of Daijō-daijin
 Sesshō and Kampaku

References

Related bibliography
  Asai, T. (1985). Nyokan Tūkai. Tokyo: Kōdansha.
 Dickenson, Walter G. (1869). Japan: Being a Sketch of the History, Government and Officers of the Empire. London: W. Blackwood and Sons. 
 Hall, John Whitney, Delmer M. Brown and Kozo Yamamura. (1993). The Cambridge History of Japan. Cambridge: Cambridge University Press. 
 Ozaki, Yukio. (2001). The Autobiography of Ozaki Yukio: The Struggle for Constitutional Government in Japan. [Translated by Fujiko Hara]. Princeton: Princeton University Press.  (cloth)
  Ozaki, Yukio. (1955). Ozak Gakudō Zenshū. Tokyo: Kōronsha.
 Sansom, George (1958). A History of Japan to 1334. Stanford: Stanford University Press.
 Screech, Timon. (2006). Secret Memoirs of the Shoguns: Isaac Titsingh and Japan, 1779–1822. London: RoutledgeCurzon. 
  Titsingh, Isaac. (1834). [Siyun-sai Rin-siyo/Hayashi Gahō, 1652], Nipon o daï itsi ran; ou, Annales des empereurs du Japon. Paris: Oriental Translation Fund of Great Britain and Ireland.
 Varley, H. Paul, ed. (1980). [Kitabatake Chikafusa, 1359], Jinnō Shōtōki ("A Chronicle of Gods and Sovereigns: Jinnō Shōtōki of Kitabatake Chikafusa" translated by H. Paul Varley). New York: Columbia University Press. 

Government of feudal Japan
Japanese historical terms
Meiji Restoration